The name Nepartak has been used for four tropical cyclones in the western north Pacific Ocean. The word is originally the designation for a famous Kosrae warrior and is derived from a language of the Federated States of Micronesia.

 Typhoon Nepartak (2003) (T0320, 25W, Weng) – struck the Philippines and China.
 Tropical Storm Nepartak (2009) (T0919, 21W)
 Typhoon Nepartak (2016) (T1601, 02W, Butchoy) – a very powerful storm which impacted Taiwan and devastated East China.
 Tropical Storm Nepartak (2021) (T2108, 11W) - a weak storm which affected Japan.

Pacific typhoon set index articles